Loving Amanda is a 2021 Nigerian romance film produced by Laju Iren, based on the novel that she wrote, and directed by Michael Akinrogunde under the production studio of Laju Iren Films.  The film stars Blossom Chukwujekwu, Teniola Aladese, Chinonso Arubayi and Adesunmbo Adeoye.

Synopsis 
Amanda  is an orphan who grew into a young woman taken advantage of and abused, she knows nothing of inner peace until one fateful day when she meets Goch, a man of God who leads her on her  journey to redemption.

Premiere 
The film was premiered virtually; a first of its kind. It was first screened on April 15 and repeated on Easter Monday, April 18, 2021

Cast   
Sunmbo Adeoye
Murewa Alade 
Teniola Aladese
Chinonso Arubayi
Steve Asinobi
Alex Ayalogu
Kikelomo Balogun
Michael Bassey
Joy Bliss
Solomon Bryan
Blossom Chukwujekwu
Femi Laco Coker
Pela Snr
Rita Edward

External links 

imdb

References 

2021 films
Nigerian romance films
English-language Nigerian films
2021 romance films